In Mandaeism, Bihram or Bihram Rabba ("Bihram the Great") is an uthra (angel or guardian) who presides over the masbuta, or baptism ritual. Bihram is mentioned in Mandaean texts such as the Qolasta. Many Mandaean masbuta ritual prayers invoke the name of Bihram.

Etymology
The name Bihram may have originally been derived from the Persian name Bahram, in reference to one or several of the Sasanian kings of the third century A.D.

Uthra of baptism
Mandaeans consider Bihram to be the uthra of baptism. Similarly, in Sethianism, Micheus, Michar, and Mnesinous are three heavenly guardian spirits presiding over the baptism of the Living Water (see also Five Seals).

Mandaean name

Bihram is also a Mandaean male baptismal name (as opposed to Mandaean birth names). Notable Mandaeans with the name include Yahya Bihram. In the colophons of Mandaean texts, the name Bihram is also often mentioned for different priests and copyists of various eras.

In Mandaean scriptures
In chapter 3 of the Mandaean Book of John, Bihram, led by Nbaṭ and the uthras Gubran, Yawar, and Yukabar, helps lead a rebellion against Yushamin and his 21 sons. Yawar slays 12 of Yushamin's sons, while Bihram slays 9 of them.

See also
List of angels in theology
Bahram (name)
 Bahrām I, r. 273-276
 Bahrām II, r. 276-293
 Bahrām III, r. 293
Vahrām
Micheus, Michar, and Mnesinous in Sethianism

References

Individual angels
Uthras
Baptism
Aramaic-language names
Water spirits
Masculine given names
Mandaean given names
Personifications in Mandaeism